Antonio "Toni" Calvo Arandes (born 28 March 1987) is a Spanish professional footballer who plays as a winger for FC Santboià.

He spent the better part of his career with Aris (Greece) and Anorthosis (Cyprus).

Club career

Barcelona / Aris
Born in Barcelona, Catalonia, Calvo joined FC Barcelona's La Masia academy at the age of 12. He made his senior debut in the 2006–07 season, totalling 385 minutes of play (only one start) as the reserves suffered relegation from the Segunda División B.

Calvo signed with Greek side Aris Thessaloniki F.C. in summer 2007, agreeing to a three-year contract and reuniting with Barcelona teammate Javito (and several others overall, including manager Quique Hernández). On 29 November, he scored in a 1–1 away draw against Bolton Wanderers in the group stage of the UEFA Cup.

In August 2009, Calvo renewed his contract with the Thessaloniki club for a further two years. He netted six times across all competitions during that season, five in the Superleague and one in the cup, as the team finished fifth in the former competition.

Parma / Bulgaria
On 27 December 2010, Parma F.C. confirmed Calvo had joined on loan until the end of the campaign. He made his Serie A debut on 6 January of the following year in a 4–1 win at Juventus F.C. where he came on as a substitute for Sebastian Giovinco, but only collected two further league appearances during his spell.

On 18 July 2011, Calvo moved to PFC Levski Sofia from Bulgaria on a one-year deal. He made his competitive debut on 4 August, in the Europa League qualifying round 2–1 defeat of FC Spartak Trnava, and first appeared in the league four days later, setting up the winning goal for Ivan Tsvetkov in a 1–0 home victory over PFC Slavia Sofia; he scored his first goal for the club on 21 October, in a 3–2 win against PFC Kaliakra Kavarna.

Anorthosis
In July 2012, Calvo moved to the Cypriot First Division with Anorthosis Famagusta FC, requesting to be released at the end of the season due to the fact he was the player with the highest salary on the team and the club was facing economic problems. President Savvas Kakos obliged, but the player eventually returned for the following campaign with a much revised contract.

Later years
On 6 July 2016, Calvo returned to Greece and its top level by agreeing to a one-year deal with Veria F.C. for an undisclosed fee. He took his game to the Catalan regional leagues in 2018 and, the following year, had a failed trial at Niki Volou FC.

International career
Overall, Calvo earned 16 caps for Spain at youth level. He represented the under-20 team at the 2007 FIFA World Cup in Canada, playing four times for the quarter-finalists.

Club statistics

Honours
Spain U19
UEFA European Under-19 Championship: 2006

References

External links

Levski official profile

1987 births
Living people
Footballers from Barcelona
Spanish footballers
Association football wingers
Segunda División B players
Tercera División players
Divisiones Regionales de Fútbol players
FC Barcelona C players
FC Barcelona Atlètic players
FC Santboià players
Super League Greece players
Aris Thessaloniki F.C. players
Veria F.C. players
Serie A players
Parma Calcio 1913 players
First Professional Football League (Bulgaria) players
PFC Levski Sofia players
Cypriot First Division players
Anorthosis Famagusta F.C. players
Spain youth international footballers
Spanish expatriate footballers
Expatriate footballers in Greece
Expatriate footballers in Italy
Expatriate footballers in Bulgaria
Expatriate footballers in Cyprus
Spanish expatriate sportspeople in Greece
Spanish expatriate sportspeople in Italy
Spanish expatriate sportspeople in Bulgaria
Spanish expatriate sportspeople in Cyprus